Miriam Kolodziejová (born 11 April 1997) is a Czech tennis player.
On 16 May 2022, she reached her best singles ranking of world No. 247. On 30 January 2023, she peaked at No. 48 in the WTA doubles rankings.
Kolodziejová has won one doubles title on the WTA Tour. She has also won seven singles and 17 doubles titles on the ITF Circuit.

Junior success

Grand Slam performance
Singles:
 Australian Open: 2R (2015)
 French Open: 3R (2015)
 Wimbledon: 1R (2015)
 US Open: 1R (2014)

Doubles:
 Australian Open: W (2015)
 French Open: W (2015)
 Wimbledon: SF (2015)
 US Open: 1R (2014)

Kolodziejová won the girls' doubles event at the 2015 Australian Open with fellow Czech Markéta Vondroušová, defeating Katharina Hobgarski and Greet Minnen in the final. She then went on to win the girls' doubles event at the 2015 French Open with Vondroušová, defeating Caroline Dolehide and Katerina Stewart in the final.

Professional Career
At the 2023 Australian Open she reached the third round partnering also with Vondroušová.

Performance timelines 
Only main-draw results in WTA Tour, Grand Slam tournaments, Fed Cup/Billie Jean King Cup and Olympic Games are included in win–loss records.

Singles

Doubles
Current after the 2023 Indian Wells Open.

WTA career finals

Doubles: 1 (title)

WTA Challenger finals

Doubles: 1 (runner-up)

ITF Circuit finals

Singles: 20 (7 titles, 13 runner–ups)

Doubles: 30 (17 titles, 13 runner–ups)

Junior Grand Slam finals

Girls doubles: 2 (2 titles)

Notes

References

External links
 
 

1997 births
Living people
Sportspeople from Most (city)
Czech female tennis players
Australian Open (tennis) junior champions
French Open junior champions
Grand Slam (tennis) champions in girls' doubles
Czech people of Polish descent
21st-century Czech women